Anti-Jewish riots occurred on June 7–8, 1948, in the towns of Oujda and Jerada, in the French protectorate of Morocco in response to the 1948 Arab–Israeli War ensuing the declaration of the establishment of the State of Israel on May 14. The two towns—located near the border with Algeria—were departure points for Moroccan Jews seeking to reach Israel; at the time they were not permitted to do so from within Morocco. In the events, 47 Jews and one Frenchman were killed, many were injured, and property was damaged. 

The riots took place a few weeks after a speech in which Sultan Mohammed V, in the context of the recent declaration of the State of Israel and ongoing Nakba, "affirmed Jews’ traditional protected status in Morocco but also warned them not to demonstrate any solidarity with the Zionist cause." In the eyes of many Moroccan Muslims, they were going to join the forces fighting the Arab armies.  

French officials argued that the riots were "absolutely localized" to Oujda and Jerada, and that it had been "migration itself - and not widespread anti-Jewish animosity - that had sparked Muslim anger".

Outbreak
René Brunel, the French Commissioner for the Oujda region, stated that rioting began when a Jewish barber attempted to cross into Algeria carrying explosives. Brunel wrote that that atmosphere has "overheated" as a result of "the clandestine passage over the border of a large number of young Zionists from all regions of Morocco trying to get to Palestine via Algeria." The French Ministry of Foreign Affairs noted that Jewish emigration from Oujda to Palestine was a significant irritant to the local Muslim population. The ministry noted, "It is characteristic that those in this region near to the Algerian border consider all Jews who depart as combatants for Israel." Alphonse Juin, Resident General in Morocco, noted that "the clandestine departure of Jews for Palestine ignited the anger already inflamed by professional agitators."

It has also been suggested that the riots were sparked by an anti-Zionist speech by Sultan Mohammed V relating to the ongoing 1948 Arab–Israeli War, but others suggest that the Sultan's speech was focused on ensuring the protection of the Moroccan Jews.

Riots
The riots began in Oujda, which was at the time the main transit hub for Jewish emigration out of Morocco because of its proximity to the Algerian border (Algeria was at the time part of Metropolitan France), in which 5 Jews were killed and 30 injured in the space of 3 hours before the army arrived. The mob riots in the neighbouring mining town of Jerada were even more violent, with 39 deaths.

Aftermath
At the time, Morocco was a protectorate of France, and the French commissioner for Oujda, René Brunel, blamed the violence on the Jews for leaving through Oujda and for sympathizing with the Zionist movement. The French League for Human Rights and Citizenship blamed the French colonial authorities for their relaxed control in the area. Several officials from the local mining federation were tried in court for instigating the massacres, and several were sentenced to life imprisonment with hard labour, with the others given lighter sentences.

As an Arab Muslim national identity became the vehicle of the anti-colonial resistance in Morocco, the violence in Oujda and Jerada demonstrated how Jews, particularly after the establishment of the State of Israel, were becoming excluded from Moroccan nationalism. While Morocco's Amazigh populations could belong as Muslims, Jews were increasingly excluded from the Moroccan nation.

The emigration of Jews from Morocco to Israel quickly became a flood after the incident since 18,000 Moroccan Jews left for Israel the following year, and 110,000 out of a total of 250,000 Jews in Morocco left between 1948 and 1956.

References

Further reading
"North African Jewry in the twentieth century: the Jews of Morocco, Tunisia, and Algeria", by Michael M. Laskier, Chapter 7: The Israeli-Directed Self-Defense Underground and "Operation Yakhin".

External links

Victims of Riots in Oujda and Jérada, June 7 and 8, 1948

Jewish Moroccan history
Mass murder in 1948
Anti-Jewish pogroms by Muslims 1941-49
Anti-Jewish pogroms by Muslims
Antisemitism in Morocco
Anti-Jewish Riots
Anti-Jewish Riots
Arab–Israeli conflict
1948 Arab–Israeli War
1948 riots
1948 in Judaism
Massacres in 1948
Massacres in Morocco